James Joseph Saxon (April 13, 1914 – January 28, 1980) was the 21st Comptroller of the Currency for the United States Department of the Treasury. He was appointed by President John F. Kennedy in 1961.

Saxon left the Office of the Comptroller in January 1967. He subsequently practiced law in Washington and served as vice chairman of the board of the American Fletcher National Bank in Indianapolis.

Biography 

James Joseph Saxon  was born on April 13, 1914 in Toledo, Ohio. He received a law degree from Georgetown University in 1950.

Saxon began his career as a securities statistician in the Office of the Comptroller of the Currency in 1937. He spent World War II as a roving problem solver for the Treasury Department, dealing with financial problems overseas.

After World War II, Saxon served as a special assistant in the office of Treasury Secretary John Snyder. In 1952 he went to work for the Democratic National Committee. After the 1952 elections, Saxon became assistant general counsel of the American Bankers Association (ABA) in its Washington, D.C., office. Saxon left the ABA to work as an attorney for the First National Bank of Chicago.

In 1961 President John F. Kennedy nominated James J. Saxon to be Comptroller of the Currency. Saxon's top priority was to expand the national banking industry and liberate national banks from regulation he deemed burdensome. Saxon permitted national banks to engage in businesses from which they had previously been barred, such as selling insurance and issuing credit cards.

In his first years as Comptroller, Saxon changed the agency substantially by expanding its legal and economic staffs, undertaking a program to expand bank powers, and welcoming new banks and branches into the national banking system in contrast to the more restrictive practices of his immediate predecessors. Saxon created a system of regional comptrollers, each of whom exercised significant authority and autonomy. After resignation, he returned to the practice of law. He had a wide experience with legal and banking.

James J. Saxon, had been at odds with the Federal Reserve Board for some time, encouraging broader investment and lending powers for banks that were not part of the Federal Reserve system. Saxon also had decided that non-Reserve banks could underwrite state and local general obligation bonds, again weakening the dominant Federal Reserve banks.

When Comptroller James J. Saxon took office in November 1961, he found in existence methods of handling applications for new banks, branches, and mergers that had not been changed for decades. Almost every piece of paper pertaining to an application was considered secret, and virtually no public announcements of any kind emanated from the Office. In the preceding ninety-eight-year history of the Office, there had never been a public hearing or a written opinion published on an application. Anything that smacked of controversy was considered bad for the banking "image". "In fairness to all of Saxons distinguished predecessors in office", - it was at the time, that: "these methods are the traditionally accepted ones for a bank supervisory agency. They obviously could not have survived as long as they did without the approval of industry affected, of the courts, and of Congress."

Saxon defended his controversial record of chartering 369 new national banks during 1963 and 1964, insisting that such expansion was essential to keep up with the expanding economy and to generate competition among lenders. Like many bankers, he blamed bank takeovers by unsavory characters on a loophole in federal law (since closed) that left federal officials in the dark about changes in bank ownership. Mindful of congressional cries that gangsters may still be buying up banks to sanitize their hot money, Joseph W. Barr, chairman of the Federal Deposit Insurance Corporation, announced that he set up a unit to help the Justice Department weed out criminals in banking.

Important cases 

On July 31, 1964, defendant West Side National Bank filed an application for a charter as a national bank with Saxon, Comptroller of the Currency, pursuant to the statutes and regulations controlling such applications. See 12 U.S.C. 21 et seq. and 12 C.F.R. 4.1 et seq. Pursuant to these regulations, the Comptroller caused a field investigation to be made of the applicant and the surrounding circumstances. In accordance with the established practice, the agent-examiners of Saxon called upon the competitors of the applicant bank, informed them of West Side's application and ascertained their reaction to the application.

The issue 
On August 21, 1964, the president of appellant Webster Groves Trust Company wrote the Comptroller, advising him of Webster Groves' opposition to the granting of the charter and requesting a formal hearing on the application. By letter of August 27, 1964, the Deputy Comptroller agreed to discuss the matter, and a meeting was arranged to take place in Washington, D.C. on October 6, 1964. At this conference, the representatives of Webster Groves and another objecting bank met with a Deputy Comptroller. On behalf of the objecting banks, Webster Groves filed a written protest to the granting of the charter and requested that they be furnished a copy of the application and that a formal hearing be held for the purpose of crossexamining the applicant and presenting evidence in opposition to the charter. The Deputy Comptroller indicated that the views of the objecting banks would be taken into consideration, but he did not accede to the request for a formal hearing.

On December 12, 1964, the Comptroller approved the application for the establishment of the West Side National Bank, without holding any formal hearing.

On January 27, 1965, Webster Groves and seven other banks brought this action against the Comptroller and the West Side National Bank, seeking to have the issuance of the charter declared unlawful, directing the Comptroller to cancel the charter and to conduct a formal hearing prior to the granting of another charter, and to enjoin West Side National Bank from establishing and operating its bank during the interim. Webster Groves Trust Company is the only one of the original eight plaintiffs that is appealing the District Court's judgment.

The verdict 
The Comptroller is [also] asserting that a competitor has no standing to object to lawful competition. With this rule we find no fault, but the banks surely have the standing to object to illegal competition. Frost v. Corporation Commission of Oklahoma, 278 U.S. 515, 49 S.Ct. 235, 73 L.Ed. 483 (1929); National Bank of Detroit v. Wayne Oakland Bank, 252 F.2d 537 (6 Cir. 1958), cert. denied 358 U.S. 830, 79 S.Ct. 503. Therefore, when a competitor believes he is being subjected to illegal competition owing to impropriety by the Comptroller, the courts should be open to hear and decide the alleged wrong. The trial court was vested with jurisdiction over the subject matter of this litigation.

The actions of the Comptroller under review, however, are perfectly consistent with his authorized statutory power, they did not violate any due process provisions of the Constitution and there is no indication that there has been any abuse of his discretionary authority. Consequently, for the reasons set forth herein and in the trial court's sound memorandum opinion, we believe the complaint of appellant was properly dismissed.

Judgment of the District Court is affirmed.

External links 
James Joseph Saxon biography
Comptroller of the Currency
National Bank Customer Assistance

1914 births
1980 deaths
American Bankers Association
Comptrollers in the United States
United States Comptrollers of the Currency
Chairs of the Federal Deposit Insurance Corporation
Kennedy administration personnel
Lyndon B. Johnson administration personnel